The St. Joseph Island Light was a lighthouse which stood at the entrance to Lake Borgne on the north side of Mississippi Sound. It was replaced by the Lake Borgne Light to the west as the island on which it stood was eroded, and was destroyed by a hurricane in 1893. An unmanned light was eventually erected on the ruins along with a USGS water monitoring station.

References 

Lighthouses in Mississippi
Buildings and structures in Hancock County, Mississippi
Lighthouses completed in 1861
1861 establishments in Mississippi
Buildings and structures demolished in 1893